Romulea viridibracteata is a herbaceous perennial in the family Iridaceae native to South Africa.

References

Endemic flora of South Africa
viridibracteata